Collins Gulch is a creek in the Similkameen region of British Columbia. Collins Gulch is a stream which flows into the Tulameen River from the south side. Collins Gulch was discovered in 1885. It was mined by both Europeans and Chinese for gold. Early mining efforts were successful although diggings were exhausted quite rapidly.

References

Rivers of British Columbia